Trichostetha bicolor is an afrotropical species of flower scarab beetle endemic to South Africa, where it occurs in the Cape Floristic Region. It is sometimes synonymized with Trichostetha capensis, but in addition to morphological differences, T. bicolor is found further north and in different habitat types than the former species, with no intermediate forms or populations.

References

Endemic beetles of South Africa
Cetoniinae
Beetles described in 1907